The Japanese occupation of the Solomon Islands was the period in the history of the Solomon Islands between 1942 and 1945 when Imperial Japanese forces occupied Solomon Islands during World War II.

From 1942 to 1943, and even in some islands till 1945, Imperial Japanese Army forces occupied the Solomon Islands where were the headquarters of the protectorate of the British Solomon Islands.

The Solomon Islands campaign was a major campaign of the Pacific War of World War II. The campaign began with Japanese landings and occupation of several areas in the British Solomon Islands and Bougainville Island, in the Territory of New Guinea, during the first six months of 1942. The Japanese occupied these islands and began the construction of several naval and air bases with the goals of protecting the flank of the Japanese offensive in New Guinea, establishing a security barrier for the major Japanese base at Rabaul on New Britain, and providing bases for interdicting supply lines.

Northern Solomon Islands

These islands were part of the Australian Territory of New Guinea, a League of Nations mandate since 1920. Anchoring its defensive positions in the South Pacific was the major Japanese army and navy base at Rabaul, New Britain, which had been captured from the Australians in January 1942.  In March and April, Japanese forces occupied and began constructing an airfield at Buka Island in northern Bougainville, as well as an airfield and naval base at Buin, in southern Bougainville.

British Solomon Islands

Japanese Commanders
Both commanding the Seventeenth Army, from Bougainville:
 1942 - 1945:  Harukichi Hyakutake                (b. 1888 - d. 1947)  
 1945 -  5 Sep 1945:       Masatane Kanda                (b. 1890 - d. 1983)  
— Kanda surrendered Japanese forces on Bougainville Island to Allied commanders on 8 September 1945.

Japanese occupation ends on the Solomon Islands in September 1945.

See also
Pacific Islands home front during World War II.
Solomon Islands campaign
Japanese government-issued Oceanian Pound

Further reading

 Hungerford, T. A. G. (1952). The Ridge and the River. Sydney: Angus & Robertson. Republished by Penguin, 1992; .

References 

 
Campaigns of World War II
Solomon Islands 1942-45
Solomon Islands 1942-45
Conflicts in 1942
Conflicts in 1943
Conflicts in 1944
Conflicts in 1945
1942 in the Solomon Islands
1943 in the Solomon Islands
1944 in the Solomon Islands
1945 in the Solomon Islands
Battles and operations of World War II involving the Solomon Islands
Battles and operations of World War II involving Australia
Battles and operations of World War II involving Papua New Guinea
Campaigns, operations and battles of World War II involving the United Kingdom
History of the Solomon Islands
Solomon Islands
Military history of the British Empire and Commonwealth in World War II
Axis powers